Aybak District is a district in Samangan Province, Afghanistan. It contains the town of Aybak which serves as the provincial capital of Samangan. The population in 2019 was estimated to be 116,281.

References

Districts of Samangan Province